"Thief's Theme" is a single from Nas' double album Street's Disciple. The single contains vocals from Nas' song "The World Is Yours" from his first album Illmatic:

The song featured an interpolation of the famous riff from Iron Butterfly's "In-A-Gadda-Da-Vida" performed by Incredible Bongo Band. Nas would again use the same sample on the 2006 single "Hip Hop is Dead".

Nas sponsored a contest in the United Kingdom in 2004, encouraging entrants to record a verse using the instrumental version of the song. The winner would perform a verse on the song, which appears on the UK version of Street's Disciple. Rising Son won the competition.

The song was featured in Martin Scorsese's Academy Award-winning film The Departed but was not featured on the soundtrack.

Track listing

A-side
 "Thief's Theme" (Clean Album Version) (3:00)
 "Thief's Theme" (Explicit Album Version) (3:10)
 "Thief's Theme" (Instrumental) (2:59)

B-side
 "You Know My Style" (Clean Album Version) (2:54)
 "You Know My Style" (Explicit Album Version) (2:54)
 "You Know My Style" (Instrumental) (2:49)

Charts

References

2004 singles
Nas songs
Columbia Records singles
Song recordings produced by Salaam Remi
Songs written by Nas
2004 songs